Marfa Girl is a 2012 drama film written and directed by Larry Clark, and released on his website. The film follows a group of youngsters living in the West Texas town of Marfa. It won the Marcus Aurelius Award for Best Film at the 2012 Rome Film Festival.

A sequel, Marfa Girl 2, was released in 2018.

Plot
The film follows Adam, a directionless 16-year-old living in the working class town of Marfa, Texas, and his sexual relationships with his teenage girlfriend, twenty-something neighbor, an aggressive local artist, and his pregnant high school teacher, while an unhinged, misogynistic border patrol agent watches over the neighborhood. What ensues is a web of sex, drugs, and violence as the Latino skater punks adjust to their gritty, aimless life in the dead end town.

Cast
 Adam Mediano as Adam
 Drake Burnette as Marfa Girl
 Jeremy St. James as Tom
 Mary Farley as Mary
 Mercedes Maxwell as Inez
 Indigo Rael as Donna
 Jessie Tejada as Jessie
 Richard Covurrubias as Chachi
 Erik Quintana as Erik
 Lindsay Jones as Miss Jones
 Ulysses Lopez as Ulysses
 Jimmy Gonzales as Oscar
 Elizabeth Castro as Angie
 Nathan Stevens as Ty
 Rodrigo Lloreda as Rodrigo

Production
Marfa Girl was shot exclusively in Marfa, a small town in Presidio County, Texas. The town had previously been used as the filming location for the critically acclaimed 1956 film Giant, which was the last movie to star James Dean. Clark cast a mix of professional and non-professional actors for the roles in Marfa Girl.

Release

Marfa Girl premiered at the 2012 Rome Film Festival where it won top honors. On November 20, 2012, Marfa Girl was released on Larry Clark's website priced at $5.99 for one-day streaming access. There are no plans to release the film in theaters or on DVD. Clark has said that this online-only distribution was a way of bypassing "crooked Hollywood distributors". Past films by Clark, such as Ken Park, have had difficulty in distribution because of their subject matter.

On May 19, 2014, Spotlight Pictures announced that it had secured worldwide rights to distribute the film on all platforms; subsequently streaming access to the film was removed from Larry Clark's website.

On October 14, 2014, Breaking Glass Pictures announced they acquired North American distribution rights from Spotlight Pictures. Breaking Glass Pictures released Marfa Girl theatrically and on VOD on April 3, 2015. The DVD was released June 23, 2015.

Critical reception
Despite winning the award for best film at the Rome Film Festival, the major critical attention directed at Marfa Girl has generally been more lukewarm in its enthusiasm. Boyd van Hoeij of Variety praised the cinematography while directing criticism at the acting of some cast members and the generally shallow plot, mentioning that "the sex and nudity are as plentiful as the plot and teen characters are thin." Jordan Mintzer of The Hollywood Reporter praised some aspects of the dialogue and cinematography, but said that the cinematography was "nothing new" and looked at times as if "it was ripped out of a Levi's ad."

References

External links
 

2012 films
2010s English-language films
Films directed by Larry Clark
2010s erotic drama films
American erotic drama films
Marfa, Texas
2012 drama films
2010s American films